Alexander James Mathieson (11 May 1921 – 13 May 2022) was an Australian rules footballer who played for the Geelong Football Club in the Victorian Football League (VFL).

In the same year he played for Geelong he enlisted to serve in the Royal Australian Air Force in World War II.

Notes

External links 

1921 births
2022 deaths
Australian rules footballers from Victoria (Australia)
Geelong Football Club players
Newtown & Chilwell Football Club players
Australian centenarians
Men centenarians